LifeTimes is an album by Diana Hubbard, released in 1979 by Waterhouse Records 8. In addition to Diana Hubbard, the album includes musical contributions from Chick Corea, Stanley Clarke, John Goodsall, Michael Boddicker, and Patrick Moraz.

Artist
Diana Hubbard was born in London, the daughter of L. Ron Hubbard, the author of Dianetics and other Scientology books. She was born Diana Meredith DeWolf Hubbard on September 24, 1952, to L. Ron Hubbard and his wife Mary Sue Hubbard. She was the first child born to Mary Sue and L. Ron Hubbard. She composed sonatas for piano at age 6. She attended the Royal Academy, where she took courses in ballet and music. In her early years as a teenager, she took executive courses in Scientology at Saint Hill Manor along with her brother, Quentin Hubbard. Her other siblings include Suzette and Arthur. At the age of 15, she left the Royal Academy, in order to serve within the Scientology organization and assist her father. During the bulk of her teenage years, she lived most of her life on her father's yacht, located in the Mediterranean. By age 16, she rose to the rank of Lieutenant Commander within the elite Scientology group called the Sea Org. She became a spokesperson for the branch of the Church of Scientology within the United States in 1969. In 1979, Hubbard lived with her husband audiophile Jonathan Horwich and her daughter Roanne, in Clearwater, Florida. In 1980, she served as an executive within the Church of Scientology, and as of 2001 she maintained a leadership position within the organization.

Inspiration
According to the Sarasota Herald-Tribune, Hubbard was discovered when she performed one of her original pieces backstage, at an event sponsored by the organization, while working as a representative in the United States for the Church of Scientology. She was convinced to record a few tapes of her music in 1976. LifeTimes was recorded in 1979.

In an interview about the album with The Harvard Crimson, Diana Hubbard explained her motivation and inspiration for the album. She said she wanted to compose music that "is felt but not heard", and attempted to revitalize the romantic aspects to jazz. She said that her work was "not trying to be any structured thing. In all of us we have the dreamer".

Hubbard characterized her composition style as "impressionistic paintings in music", in an interview with the St. Petersburg Times. She commented, "My music is for the time when people want to turn out the lights, listen and escape into another world ... to dream places ... to little magical places in which the listener can participate and become involved." Regarding a potential audience, Hubbard said, "My music is for intelligent listeners, who don't mind if I change chords, and are willing to see what happens next." Explaining why written text did not accompany the songs, Hubbard said, "I wrote lots of poetry. But somehow it didn't feel right to have lyrics with the pieces – I'd rather leave that slot open for the listener."

She wrote liner notes for each piece in the album, describing exactly what type of vision she was attempting to evoke with her compositions. For her description of the first track on the album, "Rose Coloured Lights", Hubbard wrote that the picture she was trying to bring about for the listener was "a yacht in the Mediterranean. Leaning over a rail at night thinking. The whole spectrum of love: the champagne of c'est la vie in a million stories..."

Production
The album was produced by an independent label, Waterhouse Records 8. Waterhouse Records was based in Minnesota, and at the time of the album's release it was available by mail order from Minneapolis. It includes performances from musicians Chick Corea and Stanley Clarke – both Scientologists. Other noteworthy contributors include Patrick Moraz and Denny Seiwell. Musical artist Jimmie Spheeris persuaded Hubbard to record the album, and also served as its executive producer. The string portions were written by David Campbell.

Hubbard wrote all of the music for the album, with contributors utilizing instruments including synthesizers, bass, woodwinds, strings, and a bouzouki. She plays piano on the album. Most of the pieces on the album are of three to four minutes in duration. Wayne Isaak served as the Waterhouse Records publicist for the album. In publicity for the album, marketing compared Hubbard's musical writing style to that of Erik Satie. The album cover was marketed with a sticker on the outside wrapping advertising the fact that it was endorsed by Stanley Clarke.

Reception
Billboard highlighted the album in its column, "Billboard's Top Album Picks", in the section "First Time Around". Billboard described the album as "a light classics pop LP" and noted, "The music is mostly soft and pretty drawing from many ethnic sources." The Sarasota Herald-Tribune described the album as "an instrumental with a medieval quality in the all-encompassing and sometimes mysterious sound of strings, piano and rhythm section. The repetitive phrasing and rolling melody are synthesized tone and nuance." The St. Petersburg Times described Hubbard's piano compositions as "fresh, haunting melodies".

In a review of the album for The Harvard Crimson, Thomas M. Levenson wrote, "Hubbard's music does not, as a result, offend the listener. It's not execrable. It is just extraordinarily dull. As a pianist/composer, Hubbard sounds like Bruckner rewritten for the dentist's office." Don Lewis reviewed the album for The Milwaukee Journal, and commented, "It's peaceful, attractive music, even though, after a while, it sounds like many of Miss Hubbard's compositions are swatches from the same bolt of cloth."

"Rose Coloured Lights" was issued as a single on Waterhouse 15003 and hit #40 on the Billboard Adult Contemporary chart in 1980.

Track listing
LifeTimes

Personnel
Musicians
Diana Hubbard – piano
Chick Corea – synthesizers
Michael Boddicker – synthesizers
Stanley Clarke – string bass
Patrick Moraz – synthesizer
John Goodsall - guitars
Ric Parnell - drums
David Campbell – violas
Jim Cowger – woodwinds
Dennis Karmazyn – cello
Al Hendrickson – bouzouki
Denny Seiwell – drums 
Johnny Pierce – bass

References

Further reading

External links
LifeTimes, information at musicstack.com
LifeTimes by Diana Hubbard, at artistdirect.com

1979 debut albums
Jazz albums by American artists
Jazz-pop albums
Pop albums by American artists